Podvrh may refer to the following places in Slovenia:

Podvrh, Braslovče
Podvrh, Gorenja Vas–Poljane
Podvrh, Osilnica
Podvrh, Sevnica